The Battle of Mełchów, one of many clashes of the January Uprising, took place on September 30, 1863, in the village of Mełchów (near Lelów), which at that time belonged to the Russian-controlled Congress Poland. Russian losses were estimated at approximately 100 killed, while Polish losses totaled 70 killed and wounded.

After skirmishes near Cierno, Warzyn and Czarnca, Chmieleński concentrated insurgent units in Drochlin, where he was joined by some riflemen of Captain Albert Esterhazy. When Russians found out about the insurgent camp, they sent there infantry, dragoons, Cossacks and two cannons. Polish forces had some 800 men, and the battle began with the Russian barrage of the village, after which infantry entered the fray. The Russian objective was to seize the local forest and then destroy the insurgent party. Chmieleński ordered his forces to halt the enemy and then sent the Polish cavalry in to counterattack. Due to the subsequent Russian artillery fire, the Polish advance was stopped. However, the insurgents regrouped and attacked again, this time with bayonets. Among those wounded during the cavalry charge was Adam Chmielowski.

The left insurgent wing under Captain Esterhazy repelled several counterattacks, but after Esterhazy's death, his units dispersed and began a retreat towards main insurgent forces. Soon afterwards Colonel Wladyczanski, commander of the right insurgent wing, was mortally wounded. The lack of both left- and right-side leaders forced Chmieleński to order all of this men to withdraw towards Lgoczanka. Russian soldiers, who were busy with looting villages in the area, did not chase the Poles.

Sources 
 Stefan Kieniewicz: Powstanie styczniowe. Warszawa: Państwowe Wydawnictwo Naukowe, 1983. .

References

Conflicts in 1863
1863 in Poland
Melchow
September 1863 events